Pedro Castro Nero (1541 – 28 September 1611) was a Roman Catholic prelate who served as Archbishop of Valencia (1611), Bishop of Segovia (1603–1611), and Bishop of Lugo (1599–1603).

Biography
Pedro Castro Nero was born in Ampudia, Spain. On 17 February 1599 he was selected by the King of Spain and confirmed by Pope Clement VIII as Bishop of Lugo. On 18 July 1599 he was consecrated bishop by Juan Fonseca, Bishop of Guadix with Sebastián Quintero Ortiz, Bishop Emeritus of Gallipoli, and Juan Pedro González de Mendoza, Bishop Emeritus of Lipari, serving as co-consecrators. On 13 August 1603 he was selected by the King of Spain and confirmed by Pope Clement VIII as Bishop of Segovia. On 12 September 1611 he was selected by the King of Spain and confirmed by Pope Paul V as Archbishop of Valencia where he served until his death 16 days later on 28 September 1611.

While bishop, he was the principal consecrator of Francisco Terrones del Caño, Bishop of Tui (1601).

See also
Catholic Church in Spain

References

External links and additional sources
 (for Chronology of Bishops) 
 (for Chronology of Bishops) 
 (for Chronology of Bishops) 
 (for Chronology of Bishops) 

1541 births
1611 deaths
17th-century Roman Catholic archbishops in Spain
Bishops appointed by Pope Clement VIII
Bishops appointed by Pope Paul V